Thom Adcox-Hernandez is an American voice actor, known for his roles as Brian in the prime-time soap opera Falcon Crest and the voices of Felix the Cat in The Twisted Tales of Felix the Cat, Lexington on Gargoyles and Klarion the Witch Boy on Young Justice.

Life and career
Adcox starred as Lexington in the Disney animated series Gargoyles, and Pupert in The Buzz on Maggie.

He also co-starred on Nazca, W.I.T.C.H., and The Grim Adventures of Billy & Mandy.

He also voiced Phineas Mason/Tinkerer in The CW4Kids series The Spectacular Spider-Man and as Klarion the Witch Boy in the Cartoon Network series Young Justice. Both were produced by Gargoyles Creator Greg Weisman.

He is openly gay.

Filmography

Audio books

References

External links

Living people
American male film actors
American male television actors
American male voice actors
20th-century American male actors
21st-century American male actors
American gay actors
21st-century American LGBT people
Place of birth missing (living people)
Year of birth missing (living people)